Harry Griffith Cramer III (born 1953) is an American folk singer from the Pacific Northwest.  He was born an army brat at Fort Bragg, North Carolina where his father was one of the Army's original Green Berets.  Hank's father, Harry Griffith Cramer Jr., was killed in Vietnam on October 21, 1957, the first Special Forces soldier to die in that conflict. Hank Cramer began singing professionally during his college days at the University of Arizona (1972-1976).  After graduation he was commissioned as an officer in the United States Army, serving 14 years in the Regulars and 14 years in the Army Reserve. The highlight of his military career was a five-year tour with his father's Green Beret unit, the 1st Special Forces Group (Airborne).  After 9/11, Hank served in Afghanistan as the Senior Signal Corps Advisor to the Afghan National Army. He retired as a lieutenant colonel in 2004.

Hank began a full-time career as a traveling folksinger in 1999.  He established a small, co-op music label known as Ferryboat Music, and has organized a number of music instruction camps and festivals. In 2006 Cramer revived the annual Pine Stump Symphony in the Methow Valley of Washington, a music event run by his late father-in-law Ron McLean from 1962 until his death in 1982.

Industry Awards

 Heartland Public Radio voted "My Sweet Wyoming Home" in the Top Five Cowboy Songs of 2007
 Texas Public Radio "Random Routes" voted "Two of a Kind" and "Della & The Dealer" in Top Twenty Songs of 2007
 Northwest Public Radio "Inland Folk" named "Songs From Maurie's Porch" one of the Top Ten Folk CDs of 2006
 Humanities Washington presented Hank their annual Performer's award in 2011

Discography

Cramer made dozens of recordings. A partial discography is available at:
www.HankCramer.com

Specific examples follow.

The Captain & The Outlaw (1982) – Hank Cramer with Dakota – Front Range Records
West By Northwest (1996) – Skookumchuck Music
Live Aboard The Wawona (1998) – Hank Cramer with The Cutters – Skookumchuck Music
Days Gone By (1999) – Ferryboat Music
Sail Away (2000) – Hank Cramer with The Cutters – Skookumchuck Music
Brave Boys! (2001) – Hank Cramer with The Rounders – Ferryboat Music
The Road Rolls On (2003) – Ferryboat Music
Songs from the USS Constellation (2003) – Hank Cramer & Constellation's Crew – Ferryboat Music
If There's One More Song (2004) – Ferryboat Music
A Soldier's Songs (2005) – Ferryboat Music
Back to Sea (2006) – Hank Cramer & Constellation's Crew – Ferryboat Music
Songs From Maurie's Porch (2006) – Ferryboat Music
Miner's Songs (2007) – Ferryboat Music
Way Out West (2007) – Ferryboat Music
Caledonia (2007) – Ferryboat Music
An Old Striped Shirt (2008) – Ferryboat Music
Open Range (2008)- Ferryboat Music
The Shantyman (2008) – Ferryboat Music
Loosely Celtic (2008) – Ferryboat Music
My Side of the Mountains (2011) – Ferryboat Music
Make the Rafters Ring (2016) - Ferryboat Music
Sing Until Morning (2019) with Dan Maher - Ferryboat Music

References

 Hank Cramer biography Inquiring Minds Alumni 
 Captain Harry Cramer – First U. S. Casualties Vietnam War Vietnam War casualties#First and last US Casualties
 45 Years Apart – Seattle Times Friday January 11, 2002 
 Black Rose Acoustic review of Caledonia 
 Acoustic Brew 2008 review 
 National Public Radio (NPR) Calling All Cowboys Sample Show

External links
Official site. Much of the biographical and discographical information in this article comes from the biography and discography on that site, accessed April 27, 2010.
 Hank Cramer from Ferryboat Music
 [ Biography on AllMusic]
 Recordings on Amazon
 Hank Cramer on SoundUnwound
 Live Aboard The Wawona
 
 

1953 births
Living people
Singers from North Carolina
American male singers
American folk singers
Maritime music
People from Fort Bragg, North Carolina